Maks Enker (sometimes shown as Max Enker) was a Polish luger who competed during the 1930s. He won the silver medal in the men's singles event at the 1935 European luge championships in Krynica, Poland and gold at the 1933 Maccabiah Games.

References
List of European luge champions 

Polish male lugers
Year of birth missing
Year of death missing
Place of birth missing